Abernethy railway station served the village of Abernethy, in Scotland.

History
Initially Abernethy Road opened concurrently with the Edinburgh and Northern Railway on 18 May 1848. When the line was extended this first station was replaced by Abernethy on 18 July 1848.

It became part of the North British Railway in 1865, and so into the London and North Eastern Railway. The line then passed on to the Scottish Region of British Railways on nationalisation in 1948. The station was closed by the British Transport Commission on 19 September 1955.

The site today
Although the line through the station site is still open for trains, as part of the Edinburgh to Aberdeen Line between Perth and Ladybank, the station at Abernethy is closed. A small section of the southbound platform is still in place, but is heavily overgrown.

References

Notes

Sources 
 
 
 
 

Disused railway stations in Perth and Kinross
Former North British Railway stations
Railway stations in Great Britain opened in 1848
Railway stations in Great Britain closed in 1848
Railway stations in Great Britain closed in 1955